The 2013 Delaware State Hornets football team represented Delaware State University in the 2013 NCAA Division I FCS football season. They were led by third-year head coach Kermit Blount and played their home games at Alumni Stadium. They were a member of the Mid-Eastern Athletic Conference (MEAC).

The Hornets entered the 2013 season having been picked to finish eighth in the MEAC.  They finished the season 5–6, 5–3 in MEAC play to finish in a tie for third place.

Schedule

References

Delaware State
Delaware State Hornets football seasons
Delaware State Hornets football